Fatima Rushdi (1908-1996) was an Egyptian actress, singer, film director, and producer who was one of the pioneers of Egyptian cinema.

Early life
Born in Alexandria, Fatima Rushdi moved to Cairo at 14 to become an actress. Without any formal training, and speaking only Arabic, she started her own theatrical troupe in 1926 and travelled throughout North Africa. Theater director `Aziz `Id fell in love with her and enabled her to learn to read and write. She became known as the "Bernhardt of the Orient" for reprising many of Sarah Bernhardt's famous roles, including Mark Anthony in Julius Caesar.

Career
In the late 1920s, Rushdi went on acting tours abroad.  She acted in Beirut, Jaffa, Haifa, Latakia, Baghdad, and in Tunisia and Algeria.  She also sailed to South America and acted in Santos, São Paolo, Rio de Janeiro, and Buenos Aires.

Her first film appearance was in Ibrahim Lama's Faji`a Fawq Al-Haram in 1928. In 1933, she directed her first and only film, al-Zarwaj, which premiered in Paris. No surviving copies are known, and in her 1970 memoir, she claimed to have burned the completed film. In the film, she starred as a woman pushed into an unhappy marriage by her father who dies tragically at the end. 

She acted in several films by Kamal Selim, including the realist film The Will al-`Azima (1939), where she played a young working-class girl falling in love with the neighbour's son. Her last screen appearance was in 1955, in a secondary role in Ahmad Diya` al-Din's Da`uni A`ish / Let Me Live.

In the 1960s, Rushdi hosted a salon for filmmakers and students at the Cairo Higher Institute for Drama Studies.

References

1908 births
1996 deaths
Egyptian actresses
Egyptian film directors
Egyptian film producers
Egyptian women film directors
Women film pioneers